Richard Perys (fl. 1419–1421) of Wells, Somerset, was an English politician.

Family
Perys married a widow, whose name is unrecorded.

Career
He was a Member (MP) of the Parliament of England for Wells in 1419 and May 1421.

References

Year of birth missing
15th-century deaths
English MPs 1419
People from Wells, Somerset
English MPs May 1421